The rufous grasswren (Amytornis whitei) is an insectivorous bird in the family Maluridae. It is found in Australia.

References

 

Amytornis
Birds described in 1910